Serhiy Holovatyi (Ukrainian: Сергій Петрович Головатий) (born May 29, 1954 in Odessa) is a Ukrainian lawyer, politician, former member of parliament, and former Minister of Justice of Ukraine.

References

External links
 

1954 births
Politicians from Odesa
First convocation members of the Verkhovna Rada
Second convocation members of the Verkhovna Rada
Third convocation members of the Verkhovna Rada
Fourth convocation members of the Verkhovna Rada
Fifth convocation members of the Verkhovna Rada
Sixth convocation members of the Verkhovna Rada
Justice ministers of Ukraine
Living people